Châu Đức is a rural district of Bà Rịa–Vũng Tàu province in the Southeast region of Vietnam. As of 2003 the district had a population of 149,707. The district covers an area of 421 km². The district capital lies at Ngãi Giao.  

There are some natural sights here such as Bàu Sen and the Xuân Sơn waterfall.

Administrative divisions
The district is subdivided to 16 commune-level subdivisions, including the township of Ngãi Giao and the rural communes of: Cù Bị, Kim Long, Xà Bang, Quảng Thành, Láng Lớn, Bàu Chinh, Bình Ba, Suối Nghệ, Bình Trung, Bình Giã, Xuân Sơn, Sơn Bình, Suối Rao, Đá Bạc and Nghĩa Thành.

References

Districts of Bà Rịa-Vũng Tàu province
Bà Rịa-Vũng Tàu province